Tephritis hungarica is a species of tephritid or fruit flies in the genus Tephritis of the family Tephritidae.

Distribution
Hungary & Romania.

References

Tephritinae
Insects described in 1937
Diptera of Europe